Ryan T. Repko (born October 1, 1999) is an American professional stock car racing driver. He competes full-time at Millbridge Speedway in the Micro Sprint division driving the No. 71 Hyper Racing Chassis for Ryan Repko Racing.

Racing career
Starting in 2015, Repko drove late models at Southern tracks like Motor Mile Speedway, Hickory Speedway and South Boston Speedway, earning Rookie of the Year honors at Motor Mile. The following year, he stepped up to CARS Tour competition. Repko continued a partial CARS slate in the following years, earning his first pole and top-five in 2017.

To start his national touring series career, Repko and Mason Mitchell Motorsports teamed up for his ARCA Racing Series debut at Madison International Speedway in 2017, which resulted in an eighth-place finish. The pair reunited in 2018, with Repko again driving the No. 78, this time at Fairgrounds Speedway. He capped off 2018 with a win in the Whelen All-American Series at Hickory at the Bobby Isaac Memorial in September.

While competing with the CARS Tour in 2019, Repko honored victims of the 2019 University of North Carolina at Charlotte shooting with a special paint scheme. On June 6, 2019, JD Motorsports announced that Repko would make his NASCAR Xfinity Series debut with the team in the CircuitCity.com 250 at Iowa Speedway later that month. Repko was announced to drive the 01. He returned to the Xfinity Series for the tour's second stop at Iowa in July, and in early August won the CARS Late Model Stock Tour Throwback 276 at Hickory Motor Speedway. Repko won in a Dave Marcis-inspired paint scheme, and met Marcis in victory lane after the event.

It was announced on December 20, 2019 that Repko would be returning to the ARCA Menards Series in 2020, running five races in the No. 20 for Venturini Motorsports in 2020, sharing the ride with Chandler Smith. His first race in the car was at the season opener at Daytona. Repko would also make his debut in the ARCA Menards Series East that year at Toledo, also in the Venturini No. 20. He picked up a top ten finish despite crashing out of the race.

Personal life
Repko attended North Lincoln High School.

Motorsports career results

NASCAR
(key) (Bold – Pole position awarded by qualifying time. Italics – Pole position earned by points standings or practice time. * – Most laps led.)

Xfinity Series

ARCA Menards Series
(key) (Bold – Pole position awarded by qualifying time. Italics – Pole position earned by points standings or practice time. * – Most laps led.)

ARCA Menards Series East

ARCA Menards Series West

 Season still in progress

References

External links
 
 

Living people
1999 births
Racing drivers from North Carolina
People from Denver, North Carolina
NASCAR drivers
ARCA Menards Series drivers
CARS Tour drivers